Magda L. Kardashian ( Harout, April 22, 1926 – September 9, 2021) was an American film, television and stage actress.

Life and career
Harout was born in Los Angeles, California on April 22, 1926, to Armenian-born stage actor Yeghishe Harout, and his wife Gohar. Her father was also the proprietor of the Ivar Theatre, which opened on the Hollywood Boulevard in 1951. During the 1940s, Harout was a pageant queen, and in 1943 she sold war bonds to support U.S. troops during World War II. On May 29, 1947, she married Robert Thomas Kardashian (1920–1998), an Army Air Forces veteran, at the First Congregation Church in Los Angeles. They later honeymooned in Hawaii.

Her stage credits included Nine Armenians (1997) by Leslie Ayvazia and The Kiss at City Hall (2000). She received a number of awards for her appearances on stage, including from LA Weekly, Drama-Logue and the LA Drama Critics Circle.

In 1999, Harout played the role of Aunt Alma in the independent comedy film A Wake in Providence. Producer and writer Vincent Pagano cast Harout promptly after meeting her, stating that "Magda opened her mouth, and we immediately fell in love with her voice.".

Harout spoke Russian, Armenian and French, and dyed her hair lighter in order not to be typecast in stereotypical ethnic roles. She also appeared in a number of television commercials. Harout died in Woodland Hills, California on September 9, 2021, at the age of 95.

Partial filmography

Film

Television

References

External links

1926 births
2021 deaths
20th-century American actresses
21st-century American actresses
Actresses from Los Angeles
American people of Armenian descent